Busdongo de Arbas is a locality and minor local entity located in the municipality of Villamanín, in León province, Castile and León, Spain. It is the birthplace of Amancio Ortega, once the wealthiest man in the world. As of 2020, it has a population of 44.

Geography 
Busdongo de Arbas is located 55km north-northwest of León.

References

Populated places in the Province of León